Sua or SUA may refer to:

Name
 Sua, common name for the Dalbergia tonkinensis tree
 Sua, a performance style of tautoga (dance), see Tautoga#Sua
 Sua Pan, a large natural topographic depression within the Makgadikgadi region of Botswana
 Sua people, an ethnic group of Aka pygmies in the Congo
 Sua language, a Mel language of Guinea-Bissau
 Sué, also spelled as Suá; god of the Sun of the Muisca
 Sova, Iran, aka "Sua", a village in Mazandaran Province, Iran
 Seilala Sua (born 1978), American discus thrower
 Sua Rimoni Ah Chong (21st century), Samoan politician
Stage name for Kim Bo-ra (born 1994), South Korean member of Dreamcatcher

Acronym
 Soka University of America, a liberal arts college in Aliso Viejo, California
 Seamen's Union of Australia, a former trade union for Australian merchant seamen
 World Council of Arameans abbreviated SUA for "Syriac Universal Alliance"
 SCCP User Adaptation, a member of the SIGTRAN family of protocols
 Single umbilical artery
 Sokoine University of Agriculture, Tanzania
 Special use airspace, in aviation
 Sporting Union Agenais, a French rugby union club based in Agen, France
 St. Ursula Academy (Toledo, Ohio), an all-girls high school in Toledo, Ohio
 St. Ursula Academy (Cincinnati, Ohio), an all-girls high school in Cincinnati, Ohio
 Subsystem for UNIX-based Applications, also known as Interix, a POSIX and Unix environment subsystem for the Windows NT operating systems
 Sudden unintended acceleration
 Convention for the Suppression of Unlawful Acts against the Safety of Maritime Navigation, often abbreviated "SUA"
 Single-unit activity, a type of single-unit recording in neuroscience
 Witham Field, Florida, IATA airport abbreviation SUA
 Suicide attempt
A software usage agreement, similar to an EULA

See also
 SUAS (disambiguation)
 Chrysophyllum cainito, a tree known as Vú Sữa in Vietnam, occasionally conflated with Dalbergia tonkinensis, see above
 Protocol for the Suppression of Unlawful Acts against the Safety of Fixed Platforms Located on the Continental Shelf (SUA PROT)